The Platteville School District is located in the city of Platteville, Grant County in southwestern Wisconsin. It is the largest school district in Grant County

The two elementary schools, Neal Wilkins and Westview, are located on opposite sides of the city. Neal Wilkins consists of the early learning center. Westview comprises first through fourth grade. Platteville Middle School is home to fifth through eighth graders. Platteville High School serves ninth through twelfth graders. O. E. Gray Early Learning Center closed after the 2007–2008 school year because of an enrollment drop in the district.

The superintendent of the school district is Mr. Jim Boebel.  Platteville High School's mascot is the Hillmen, named after Coach Hill from the early-mid 1900s.

References

External links
Platteville School District

School districts in Wisconsin
Education in Grant County, Wisconsin